is a Japanese footballer currently playing as a defender for Kagoshima United.

Career statistics

Club
.

Notes

References

1999 births
Living people
Association football people from Mie Prefecture
Osaka University of Health and Sport Sciences alumni
Japanese footballers
Association football defenders
J3 League players
Kagoshima United FC players